Richard Townsend Turner Forman is a landscape ecologist. He is a professor at the Graduate School of Design and Harvard College in the Harvard University. Forman has been called the "father" of landscape ecology for his work linking ecological science with spatial patterns describing how people and nature interweave on land.

He is the author of a widely held textbook for landscape ecology, "Land Mosaics: The Ecology of Landscapes and Regions." According to WorldCat, the book is held in 564 libraries 

He served as Vice President of the Ecological Society of America from 1982-1983 and was elected a Fellow in 2012.

Publications 

Forman, Richard  T. T. and Michel Godron 1986. Landscape Ecology. John Wiley and Sons (New York)  
Forman, Richard T. T. 1995. Land Mosaics: The Ecology of Landscapes and Regions. Cambridge [England]: Cambridge University Press, 

Forman, Richard T. T. et al. 2003.  Road Ecology: Science and Solutions. Washington, DC: Island Press, 2003. 
Forman, Richard T. T., ed.  1979. Pine Barrens: Ecosystem and Landscape. New York: Academic Press,    According to WorldCat, the book is held in 562 libraries
Forman, R. T. T.  2008.   Urban Regions: Ecology and Planning Beyond the City.  Cambridge University Press, Cambridge/New York.  408 pp .
Forman, R. T.T.  2014.   Urban Ecology: Science of Cities.  Cambridge University Press, Cambridge/New York.  462 pp. [Finalist, Society of Biology 2014 Book Award; Chinese edition in preparation].
Forman, R. T. T. 2015. Launching landscape ecology in America and learning from Europe. In History of Landscape Ecology in the United States. G.W. Barrett, T.L. Barrett and J. Wu, eds. New York: Springer. Pages 13–30.

References 

Living people
Harvard Graduate School of Design faculty
Fellows of the Ecological Society of America
1935 births